A cryolathe is a device used for freezing and grinding human corneal tissue into different refractive powers.

See also
Epikeratophakia
Keratomileusis
Refractive surgery

References

External links

Medical equipment